Benidorm is a Belgian comedy series developed and aired on the channel vtm between 1989 and 1992. 26 episodes were made. Most of the storylines are set in the Spanish town of Benidorm.

The series were written by Eddy Asselbergs. The first season is based upon Asselbergs theatre play "We gaan naar Benidorm" (We are heading to Benidorm). The second season is based upon on original script.

Cast
 Janine Bischops: Angele
 Johny Voners: Gaston
 Max Schnur: Tuur 
 Maria Bossers: Germaine
 Jo Leemans: Mariette
 Bob Van Staeyen: Theo
 Tony Bell: Karel
 Yvonne Verbeeck: Lisa
 Luc Van Puym: Pedro 
 Peggy De Greef: Willemijn
 René Wattez: Kees 
 Kikki Amity: shop owner (Season 1), Ansje (Season 2)
 Eddy Asselbergs: Pedro / Jesus
 Bert Champagne: Jean 
 Bor: Snoetje
 Jacky Lafon: Carmen

Story
Gaston and Angèle go on vacation to Blankenberge for several years. As they mostly have bad weather, Angèle decides they go abroad and chooses Benidorm as their next location. Gaston does not want to go, but is forged. She asks their neighbours Tuur and Germaine to join but they refuse. Once there it turns out their hotel is not yet finished. There is no electricity in the corridors, no elevator, no swimming pool, ... and the workers start at 6 AM . They make friends with their upper neighbours Theo and Mariette who bought their apartment.

Angèle decides to sunbathe but burns. Gaston makes disadvantage and goes out with some Dutch women. Their boyfriends make revenge and Gaston is beaten. However, on last day of their vacation the incident is settled. Gaston announces he does love Benidorm, in contradicaton to Angèle, so he bought the apartment. Angèle is upset as they can't pay this.

Once home it turns out the cellar is under water. Tuur is asked to fix the problem. Angèle sneakily asks Tuur to install a sauna. Gaston and Tuur set up a swindle in cheap wine Their most important customer is Gaston's boss. When he finds out the truth he is actually surprised and even promotes Gaston as his personal driver. In meantime, Angèles mother went to Benidorm to arrange the problem with the apartment. She calls to tell she did buy the residence and even bought a second for herself. However, it turns out it is a timesharing contract.

Sources

Belgian television sitcoms
1980s Belgian television series
1990s Belgian television series
1989 Belgian television series debuts
1992 Belgian television series endings
Television shows set in the Valencian Community